Get Ready is the fourth album by American New York City based Kleeer.

Track listing
"Get Ready" (Norman Durham)  5:55	
"Pritty Things" (Richard Lee)  4:02	 	
"Slidin' & Glidin'" (Woody Cunningham)  5:25 		
"Stonseee" (Norman Durham, Paul Crutchfield, Richard Lee, Woody Cunningham)  3:15	 	
"She Said She Loves Me" (Woody Cunningham)  6:02	 	
"Say You'll Stay" (Norman Durham, Woody Cunningham)  4:50 	
"Your Love Is What I Need" (Norman Durham)  5:46

Personnel
Norman Durham - percussion, synthesizer, lead and backing vocals
Woody Cunningham - percussion, rap, lead vocals
Paul Crutchfield - congas, percussion, synthesizer, backing vocals
Richard Lee - guitar, backing vocals
David Frank, Khris Kellow, Rick James, Khris Kellow - synthesizer
Doc Powell - guitar
Louis Smalls - acoustic piano
John "Skip" Anderson - acoustic piano, synthesizer
Danny Lamelle - saxophone
Ethel Beatty, Luther Vandross, Debbie Cole, Lynn Gerber - backing vocals

Charts

Singles

References

External links
 Kleeer-Get Ready at Discogs

1982 albums
Kleeer albums
Atlantic Records albums